Creil  is a commune in the Oise department in northern France. The Creil station is an important railway junction.

History

Archaeological remains in the area include a Neolithic site as well as a late Iron Age necropolis, perhaps belonging to a Gaulish fortress or protected camp.

The city itself is mentioned for the first time in a 633 AD document.

The Château de Creil is recorded from the 7th century.

There are some traces of a castle in which Charles VI resided during the period of his madness,  1390. Creil played a part of some importance in the wars of the 14th, 15th and 16th centuries.

Population

International relations
Creil is twinned with:

 Marl, Germany
 Pendle, England, United Kingdom
 Chorzów, Poland
 Bethlehem, Palestinian Territories
 Nabadji Civol, Senegal
 Ouro Sogui, Senegal
 Nefta, Tunisia
 Dakhla, Western Sahara

Personalities
 Houssen Abderrahmane, footballer
 Simon Banza, footballer
 Jean-François Christophe, footballer
 Fabé Dia, athlete 
 Michel Chion, French film theorist and composer of experimental music
 Steve Furtado, footballer
 Helene Geoffroy, politician
 Keblack, rapper
 Lynel Kitambala, footballer
 , French engineer
 Johann Lion, former footballer
 Paccelis Morlende, basketball player

See also
 Communes of the Oise department

References

External links

Town hall official website 

Communes of Oise